Pietari Inkinen (born 29 April 1980, Kouvola, Finland) is a Finnish violinist and conductor.

Biography
Inkinen began violin and piano studies at age 4.  As a youth, he also performed in a rock band.  He attended the Sibelius Academy and graduated with diplomas in violin (2003) and conducting (2005).  He studied violin at the Hochschule für Musik Köln with Zakhar Bron.  Inkinen has performed on a Carlo Bergonzi 1732 violin.  He leads a chamber trio, the Inkinen Trio.

In May 2007, Inkinen was named the second music director of the New Zealand Symphony Orchestra.  He formally assumed the post in January 2008.  In October 2013, the NZSO announced the extension of Inkinen's contract through the 2015 season.  Inkinen concluded his NZSO tenure at the end of 2015, and now has the title of Honorary Conductor of the NZSO.  He and the NZSO have recorded music of Einojuhani Rautavaara and of Jean Sibelius for the Naxos label, and of Richard Wagner for EMI Classics.  In Australia, his work in opera has included his conducting of Opera Australia's Melbourne Ring Cycle in 2013, following the resignation of Richard Mills.

In September 2009, Inkinen became principal guest conductor of the Japan Philharmonic Orchestra (JPO).  In April 2015, the JPO appointed Inkinen as its next chief conductor, effective September 2016, with an initial contract of 3 seasons.  The most recent extension of his JPO contract, announced in May 2021, is through August 2023.  He is scheduled to stand down as chief conductor of the JPO in August 2023.

In Europe, Inkinen was named the new chief conductor of the Ludwigsburg Schlossfestspiele in March 2014, for the period from 2015 through 2017.  In October 2014, the Prague Symphony Orchestra announced the appointment of Inkinen as its next chief conductor, as of September 2015.   He had first conducted the Prague Symphony Orchestra in 2007.  His first guest-conducting appearance with the Deutsche Radio Philharmonie Saarbrücken Kaiserslautern was in 2010.  In September 2016, the orchestra named Inkinen its next chief conductor, effective with the 2017–2018 season, with an initial contract of 4 years.

In May 2021, the KBS Symphony Orchestra announced the appointment of Inkinen as its next chief conductor and music director, effective January 2022, with an initial contract through the end of 2024.

References

External links
 Official website of Pietari Inkinen
 KünstlerSekretariat am Gasteig agency German-language biography of Pietari Inkinen
 NZSO biography page on Inkinen

1980 births
Living people
Helpmann Award winners
Finnish violinists
Male violinists
Finnish conductors (music)
Hochschule für Musik und Tanz Köln alumni
New Zealand Symphony Orchestra people
21st-century conductors (music)
21st-century violinists
21st-century male musicians
Oehms Classics artists